Loïc Perizzolo (born 20 October 1988, in Veyrier) is a Swiss racing cyclist who competes on the track.

Career wins

2006 - UIV Cup Dortmund, U23 (GER)

External links

1988 births
Living people
Swiss male cyclists
Swiss track cyclists
Sportspeople from the canton of Geneva